James "Jeep" Johnson was an American baseball shortstop in the Mexican League and Negro leagues.  He played with the Alijadores de Tampico in 1940 and the Philadelphia Stars in 1943.

References

External links
 and Seamheads

Alijadores de Tampico players
Philadelphia Stars players
Year of birth missing
Year of death missing
Baseball shortstops